Charlie Jackson (born November 4, 1976) is an American football coach. He is the assistant head coach and defensive backs coach at the United States Air Force Academy. Jackson served as the head football coach at Kentucky State University from 2019 to 2021.

Jackson was an assistant coach for the Atlanta Falcons of the National Football League (NFL) from 2017 to 2018. He served on the NCAA National Headquarters Enforcement Staff before joining the Falcons. Jackson's background includes multiple defensive coaching roles with the Green Bay Packers and Denver Broncos and coaching fellowships with the Falcons and St. Louis Rams.  He also served as a college scout for the Seattle Seahawks.  His collegiate experience includes Colorado, UCLA, Utah State, Buffalo, and Air Force.

Early life
Born in Vienna, Georgia, Jackson is a 1995 academic honors graduate of Macon County High School in Montezuma, Georgia.  As a football player at Macon County, he was named to the Georgia Academic All-State football team and many on the field accolades, including First Team All-State recognition and Georgia Class-A Football Defensive Player of the Year honors.  He was named First Team All-Area by the Americus Times-Recorder, First Team All-Middle Georgia by the Macon Telegraph & News, and First Team All-State by the Atlanta Journal-Constitution and the Georgia Sports Writers Association.

College
Jackson accepted an appointment to the United States Air Force Academy, and he participated in football and indoor track and field as a student-athlete.  One of his many football highlights was his sophomore season performance against the United States Naval Academy in 1997.  In front of the largest crowd in Navy-Marine Corps Memorial Stadium history, undefeated and #16 ranked Air Force traveled to Annapolis and defeated Navy 10-7.  Jackson was named player of the game and subsequently conference player of the week.  Following his senior football season, Jackson was selected by his teammates as a permanent team captain and recipient of Air Force football’s highest honor, the Brian Bullard Award, as the player who displays unselfishness, pride in his role, total team commitment, and 110 percent effort.  Jackson helped Air Force become a consistent member of the Top 25 national rankings, including a Top 10 final ranking and conference championship in 1998.

                                                                                            
Jackson earned a bachelor's degree in management from the United States Air Force Academy.  He has a master's degree in management and sports studies from California State University, Long Beach.

Military service
Jackson was a Commissioned Officer in the United States Air Force and ascended to the rank of Captain while being stationed more than four years at Tyndall Air Force Base, Florida and Los Angeles Air Force Base, California.  His duties included serving as the U.S. Government point man in negotiations with three foreign government agencies in support of international treaty agreements

Coaching career
On February 17, 2017, Jackson was hired as an assistant coach with the Atlanta Falcons of the National Football League (NFL). On February 1, 2019, Jackson was named head football coach at Kentucky State University. He is the winningest (percentage) head football coach at Kentucky State since 1945 (WWII) minimum 20 games. Jackson arrived at Kentucky State with the football program in the midst of a downward spiral that culminated in a 0-10 season in 2018. He took over a program on a 12-game losing streak and a record of 1-16 in the previous 17 games. In his first year leading the program in 2019, the team win total improved by seven games, the highest total win improvement in the country. His team posted victories over multiple Division 1 opponents for the first time in school history, and his team's 70 percent winning percentage (7-3) was the program's best in 41 years. After not competing in 2020 due to COVID-19, the next season produced more winning and the team's 14 win improvement over two seasons ranked #1. Jackson's team set many university records including points in an away game (76), points in a home game (63), total yards in a game (746), rush yards in a game (662), Division 1 victories, and most players with a 3.0 GPA or higher. Less than one month into his first season, Jackson had multiple historic victories including the 36th-annual Circle City Classic.

Professional organizations
Jackson is a member of the Fellowship of Christian Athletes (FCA).  His professional associations include the American Football Coaches Association (AFCA), NFL Coaches Association (NFLCA), National Association of Collegiate Directors of Athletics (NACDA), National Association of Athletics Compliance (NAAC), Minority Coaches Association of Georgia (MCAofGA), and the National Association of Collegiate Women Athletics Administrators  (NACWAA).

Head coaching record

References

External links
 Kentucky State profile

1976 births
Living people
American football safeties
Air Force Falcons football coaches
Air Force Falcons football players
Atlanta Falcons coaches
Buffalo Bulls football coaches
Denver Broncos coaches
Green Bay Packers coaches
Kentucky State Thorobreds football coaches
Seattle Seahawks scouts
Utah State Aggies football coaches
California State University, Long Beach alumni
People from Montezuma, Georgia
People from Vienna, Georgia
Coaches of American football from Georgia (U.S. state)
Players of American football from Georgia (U.S. state)
African-American coaches of American football
African-American players of American football
20th-century African-American sportspeople
21st-century African-American sportspeople